Brad Rheingans (born December 13, 1953) is an American former Greco-Roman wrestler and professional wrestler. He was a member of the United States' Greco-Roman wrestling teams for the 1976 and 1980 Summer Olympics, as well as winning two gold medals in the 1975 and 1979 Pan American Games and a bronze medal in the 1979 World Wrestling Championships.

Early life 
Rheingans was born in Appleton, Minnesota. While in high school, he won honours in football, wrestling, and track and field. His high school friends included fellow future professional wrestling personality Eric Bischoff. After graduating high school, Rheingans enrolled in North Dakota State University.

Amateur wrestling career 
Originally from Appleton, Rheingans was an NCAA Division II champion in 1975 for North Dakota State University and wrestled in the 1976 Olympics, placing fourth. He qualified for the Olympic team in 1980, but did not compete due to the United States boycott. Between Olympics, he placed third for a bronze medal at the 1979 World Wrestling Championships. He was later inducted into the Tribune Hall of Fame. Rheingans also won gold medals in the 1975 and 1979 Pan American Games.

From 1976 to 1977, Rheingans served as assistant wrestling coach for the University of Minnesota.
He went on to serve as a coach for the Minnesota Wrestling Club, where he trained Jeff Blatnick for the 1980 Summer Olympics.
Like Rheingans, Blatnick qualified for the Olympic team in 1980, but did not compete due to the United States boycott.

Professional wrestling career 
Rheingans entered professional wrestling in 1980, training under Verne Gagne and Billy Robinson. He debuted in Gagne's American Wrestling Association.

He also wrestled briefly for the WWF as an enhancement talent in 1986, occasionally for World Championship Wrestling from 1989 to 1990, and for various independent promotions in the Minnesota area during the early half of the 1990s.

New Japan Pro-Wrestling (1989–1993) 
In 1989, Rheingans began touring Japan with New Japan Pro-Wrestling (NJPW), allying himself with his former trainee Leon White, now known as Big Van Vader, and Buzz Sawyer in battling Antonio Inoki, Tatsumi Fujinami, Riki Choshu and Kengo Kimura, but later, he would aid New Japan in their battle against USSR amateur wrestlers such as Salman Hashimikov, Victor Zangiev, Vladimir Berkovich, Timur Zalasov and Wahka Evloev for the remainder of the year. In 1990, he started to help training young wrestlers on the NJPW Dojo, most notably Koji Kitao and Osamu Nishimura. In that time his most notable match was against another decorated amateur wrestler in Victor Zangiev from the Soviet Union on February 10 at the Tokyo Dome, in a winning effort. Later on, he would only engage against young lions such as Michiyoshi Ohara, Hiroyoshi Yamamoto, Manabu Nakanishi, Yuji Nagata and many others. His last match on New Japan saw Rheingans defeat El Samurai on December 11, 1993.

Retirement 
Rheingans retired in 1995 after undergoing major reconstructive surgery on both knees. After recovering, he began working as a trainer and as the American booker for NJPW, hiring wrestlers to tour Japan with the promotion. In the early 1990s, Rheingans helped broker a working agreement between NJPW and World Championship Wrestling.

After retiring, Rheingans opened the World Wide School of Professional Wrestling in Hamel, Minnesota.

Rheingans was inducted into the George Tragos/Lou Thesz Professional Wrestling Hall of Fame in 2004.

Championships and accomplishments

Amateur wrestling 
Alan & Gloria Rice Greco-Roman Hall of Champions
Class of 2014
Amateur Athletic Union Greco-Roman National Championships
Winner, 220 lbs class (1979)
National Collegiate Athletic Association
NCAA Division I All-American (1975)
NCAA Division II Champion (1975)
Olympic Games
United States Greco-Roman wrestling team member (1976, 1980)
Pan American Games
Gold medal, 220 lbs class (1975, 1979)
World Cup of Amateur Wrestling
Winner, 220 lbs class (1976)
World Wrestling Championships
Bronze medal (1979)

Professional wrestling 
American Wrestling Association
AWA World Tag Team Championship (1 time) – with Ken Patera
George Tragos/Lou Thesz Professional Wrestling Hall of Fame
Class of 2004
Pro Wrestling America
PWA Tag Team Championship (1 time) – with Baron von Raschke
Wrestling Observer Newsletter
Rookie of the Year (1981) shared with Brad Armstrong

References

External links 
 
 

1953 births
American male professional wrestlers
Living people
American male sport wrestlers
North Dakota State Bison wrestlers
Olympic wrestlers of the United States
People from Appleton, Minnesota
Professional wrestlers from Minnesota
Professional wrestling trainers
Wrestlers at the 1976 Summer Olympics
Pan American Games medalists in wrestling
Pan American Games gold medalists for the United States
Wrestlers at the 1975 Pan American Games
Wrestlers at the 1979 Pan American Games
Medalists at the 1975 Pan American Games
Medalists at the 1979 Pan American Games
20th-century professional wrestlers
AWA World Tag Team Champions